5951 Alicemonet, provisional designation , is a stony Flora asteroid approximately 6 kilometres in diameter from the inner regions of the asteroid belt. It was discovered on 7 October 1986, by American astronomer Edward Bowell at Anderson Mesa Station of the Lowell Observatory in Flagstaff, Arizona. The asteroid was named after American astronomer Alice Monet.

Orbit and classification 

Alicemonet is a member of the Flora family, one of the largest groups of stony asteroids in the main-belt. It orbits the Sun in the inner main-belt at a distance of 1.7–2.7 AU once every 3 years and 3 months (1,190 days). Its orbit has an eccentricity of 0.22 and an inclination of 5° with respect to the ecliptic.

A first precovery was obtained at Palomar Observatory in 1952, extending the body's observation arc by 34 years prior to its official discovery observation at Anderson Mesa.

Physical characteristics

Lightcurves 

In September 2012, a rotational lightcurve of Alicemonet was obtained using the SARA telescope at Cerro Tololo, Chile. The photometric observations gave a well-defined rotation period of  hours with a brightness variation of 0.46 magnitude.

Diameter and albedo 

According to the survey carried out by the NEOWISE mission of NASA's space-based Wide-field Infrared Survey Explorer,  Alicemonet measures between 5.89 and 5.99 kilometers in diameter and its surface has an albedo of 0.284 and 0.293, respectively.

The Collaborative Asteroid Lightcurve Link assumes a stony albedo of 0.24 – derived from 8 Flora, the largest member and namesake of this orbital family – and calculates a diameter of 5.9 kilometers with an absolute magnitude of 13.3.

Naming 

This minor planet was named after American astronomer Alice K. B. Monet (born 1954) at the United States Naval Observatory Flagstaff Station and former chair of the Division on Dynamical Astronomy of the AAS. She contributed to the NEAR Shoemaker and Galileo Mission and is known for her numerous astrometric observations. The approved naming citation was published by the Minor Planet Center on 1 July 1996.

References

External links 
 IAU: Individual Members – Alice K.B. Monet
 Asteroid Lightcurve Database (LCDB), query form (info )
 Dictionary of Minor Planet Names, Google books
 Asteroids and comets rotation curves, CdR – Observatoire de Genève, Raoul Behrend
 Discovery Circumstances: Numbered Minor Planets (5001)-(10000) – Minor Planet Center
 
 

005951
Discoveries by Edward L. G. Bowell
Named minor planets
19861007